Bruno Andrade (born February 6, 1991 in São Paulo is a Brazilian racing driver.

Career

Karting
Andrade began his racing career in karting in 2004. He continued karting in junior categories in 2005 and 2006

In 2007 Andrade became champion São Paulo kart, Graduates in category B. In 2008, he was runner-up Grand Prix RBC, Graduate category A.

Formula Three Sudamericana
In 2009, Andrade competed in Formula Three Sudamericana Lights finishing third and Formula São Paulo where he won the championship.

Andrade moved up to the main championship in 2010 and won four of the first six races. In the last race, he was in third and his closest championship challenger, Yann Cunha, the only one who could take the championship from him, was behind him. In a controversial turn of events, Cunha made contact with Andrade during the race and Cunha won the championship by four points, but 
Andrade was declared champion of the Formula Three Sudamericana in 2010, official result was decided in court on March 30, 2012 in Rio de Janeiro. Cunha, was disqualified from the last race as a result of the collision with Andrade.

Indy Lights
Andrade made his Firestone Indy Lights debut at the Honda Indy Toronto race weekend driving for Bryan Herta Autosport as teammate to former F3 Sudamericana teammate Duarte Ferreira. He competed in that race as well as the next three and had a best finish of sixth in the first race of the double-header in Edmonton.

Racing record

Career summary

References

External links

1991 births
Living people
Brazilian racing drivers
Formula 3 Sudamericana drivers
Indy Lights drivers
Racing drivers from São Paulo

Bryan Herta Autosport drivers